Piggy Wood is a   Local Nature Reserve on the northern outskirts of Bracknell in Berkshire. It is owned and managed by  Bracknell Forest Borough Council.

Geography and site

This site is ancient woodland, with a stream that feeds The Cut. There is access from Howell Close and Newport Drive.

History

The name of the site is thought to come from the time of the Reformation, where the term 'pig' was a derogatory term for a priest. To escape from persecution, priests from Hurley Church were said to have hidden in the wood.

The site was adopted by the Bracknell Forest council in 1998. In 2002 the site was declared as a local nature reserve by Bracknell Forest Borough Council.

Flora

The site has the following flora:

Plants

Geum urbanum
Anemone nemorosa
Hyacinthoides non-scripta
Caltha palustris

References

Local Nature Reserves in Berkshire
Warfield